Jack Hardy (10 April 1927 – 31 March 1998) was an Australian rules footballer who played with Carlton in the Victorian Football League (VFL).

Notes

External links 

Jack Hardy's profile at Blueseum

1927 births
Carlton Football Club players
Australian rules footballers from Victoria (Australia)
University Blacks Football Club players
1998 deaths